The Za class are a class of diesel locomotives built by English Electric Rocklea for the Tasmanian Government Railways in 1973.

History
With the construction of a new line from Launceston to Bell Bay, Tasmanian Government Railways placed an order for four 1752 kW locomotives with English Electric. A further two were delivered in 1976, ZA 6 being the final locomotive built by GEC Australia and the last English Electric locomotive built anywhere. The 1976 locomotives differed from the earlier batch in having a rounded cab roof, similar to the Z class, instead of an angled roof like the 2350 class from which they were derived.

In March 1978 the Za class were included in the transfer of the Tasmanian Government Railways to Australian National. From 1982 all had their vacuum brakes replaced with air brakes.

In June 1998 the five in service were renumbered as the 2114 class, ZA4 having been withdrawn.

In May 2014, 2114 joined 2115 and 2118 in storage after the new TR class entered full service. 2118 (ZA6) was held for preservation with 2115 (ZA2) retained as a parts donor.

On 14 January 2021, the Tasmanian Transport Museum announced that they had managed to secure ZA6, launching a GoFundMe campaign for its restoration the following day.

ZA 1 (2114) was delivered to Don River Railway for preservation on 23 May 2022. Its preservation funded by a sole member.

Status table

See also 
 Former Tasmanian Government Railways locomotives
 Locomotives of the Tasmanian Government Railways/1950

References

Co-Co locomotives
English Electric locomotives
Diesel locomotives of Tasmania
Railway locomotives introduced in 1973
Diesel-electric locomotives of Australia